Fourneaux-le-Val is a commune in the Calvados department in the Normandy region in northwestern France.

Population

See also
Communes of the Calvados department

References

Communes of Calvados (department)